Arquita is a genus of flowering plants in the family Fabaceae. It belongs to the subfamily Caesalpinioideae.

Species
Arquita comprises the following species:
 Arquita ancashiana (Ulibarri) E. Gagnon, G. P. Lewis & C. E. Hughes
 Arquita celendiniana (G. P. Lewis & C. E. Hughes) E. Gagnon, G. P. Lewis & C. E. Hughes
 Arquita grandiflora E. Gagnon, G. P. Lewis & C. E. Hughes
 Arquita mimosifolia (Griseb.) E. Gagnon, G. P. Lewis & C. E. Hughes
 Arquita trichocarpa (Griseb.) E. Gagnon, G. P. Lewis & C. E. Hughes
 var. boliviana E. Gagnon, G. P. Lewis & C. E. Hughes
 var. trichocarpa (Griseb.) E. Gagnon, G. P. Lewis & C. E. Hughes

References

External links 

Caesalpinieae
Fabaceae genera